Hart Goodloe (January 31, 1875 - March 21, 1954) was a surgeon in the First World War who served at Saint-Mihiel and the Meuse-Argonne Offensive. Hart Goodloe was born in Danville, Kentucky in 1875. He is a graduate of University of Louisville's School of Medicine and a member of Phi Chi Medical Fraternity's Alpha Alpha-Gamma Chapter serving as Grand Presiding Senior (President) of the Grand Chapter from 1900 to 1901. On August 13, 1917 he enlisted in the U.S. Army at age 42. He was commissioned to the rank of major and was a surgeon in the army. By 1918 he was sent over to France and saw action at the Battle of Saint-Mihiel and Meuse-Argonne Offensive. He was discharged from service on March 18, 1919, and resided in St. Louis, Missouri. His war documents were destroyed in a fire at the St. Louis archives. He died at Veterans Hospital, Biloxi, Mississippi, on March 21, 1954 at age 79.

In 2007 a novel titled "Goodloe - Blood Stains the Fury of the Coming Storm" by Patrick Bauer  was published based on the life of Hart Goodloe.   (hardcover)  (softcover) available November 2007.

References

External links
Another photograph of Goodloe

1875 births
1954 deaths
American military personnel of World War I
People from Danville, Kentucky
Military personnel from St. Louis
University of Louisville School of Medicine alumni